Neil Curtis is a fictional character from the television drama Days of Our Lives. He was portrayed by Joseph Gallison from February 13, 1974, to October 16, 1991.

Neil was a doctor and a compulsive gambler.  He had a daughter, Sarah Horton, with Maggie Horton.

He was last seen talking about Carly with Victor; then Neil said he was leaving because he had patients to see. The character then disappeared without explanation.  On October 29, 2018, Maggie tells Sarah that Neil "would be so proud" of Sarah for becoming a doctor.

External links
Neil at soapcentral.com

Days of Our Lives characters
Fictional physicians
Television characters introduced in 1974
Male characters in television